Mohammad Ashraf or Muhammad Ashraf (Urdu: محمد اشرف, Hindi: मोहम्मद अशरफ) is the name of:

Muhammad Ashraf (translator), Pakistani translator of Quran
Muhammad Ashraf (wrestler) (born 1927), Pakistani Olympic wrestler
Mohammad Ashraf Kichhouchhwi (born 1966), Indian Sufi
Syed Mohammad Izhar Ashraf (1935–2012), Indian imam
Mohammad Ashraf Naseri (born 1962), Afghan governor of Badghis Province
Muhammad Ashraf Bukhari (born 1956), Indian bureaucrat
Mohammad Zahid Ashraf (born 1973), Indian biotechnologist and academic

See also 
Chaudhry Muhammad Ashraf (disambiguation)